WATQ (106.7 FM) is a radio station broadcasting a classic country format.  Licensed to Chetek, Wisconsin, United States, the station serves the Eau Claire area.  The station is currently owned by iHeartMedia, Inc. and features programming from CBS News Radio.

History
The station went on the air as WVXD on 1992-11-05.  On 1997-02-14, the station changed its call sign to the current WATQ.  Jay Moore started broadcasting the Jay Moore in the Morning Show on the first day of local operation as MOOSE COUNTRY 106.7, May 26, 1997. Jay is currently the morning DJ from 6:00 AM to 11:00 AM, Monday through Friday.  The program is in the Classic Country format, showcasing such artists as Stonewall Jackson, Jim Reeves, Dolly Parton, Loretta Lynn, Conway Twitty, and more.

It also simulcasts the radio call for the Wisconsin Badgers Football & Basketball, NFL Green Bay Packers & MLB Milwaukee Brewers games using the statewide feed using the team radio affiliate announcers

References

External links

ATQ
Classic country radio stations in the United States
Radio stations established in 1992
IHeartMedia radio stations